"I Wanna Make You My Lady" is a song by Australian singer songwriter Mark Holden. It was recorded and released as the second single from Holden's second studio album, Let Me Love You (1976). The song was a commercial success in Australia, peaking at number 11 on the Kent Music Report.

The song is an English translation of the Swedish song "Jag ska fånga en ängel", originally written by Swedish singer-songwriters Ted and Kenneth Gärdestad, with English lyrics written by Gary Osborne.

Track listing
7"/ Cassette (EMI-11195)
Side A
 "I Wanna Make You My Lady" - 2:39

Side B
 "Never Ever Monday"	- 2:26

Charts

Weekly charts

Year-end charts

References

1976 songs
Mark Holden songs
1976 singles
Pop ballads
Songs written by Ted Gärdestad
Songs with lyrics by Gary Osborne